Melanopolia cincta is a species of beetle in the family Cerambycidae. It was described by Karl Jordan in 1903. It is known from Equatorial Guinea, Cameroon and Gabon. It contains the varietas Melanopolia cincta var. maculata.

Subspecies
 Melanopolia cincta camerunensis Dillon & Dillon, 1959
 Melanopolia cincta cincta Jordan, 1903

References

Lamiini
Beetles described in 1903